Campbell Arcade is a pedestrian arcade located in Melbourne, Victoria, Australia. The arcade is accessible from Flinders Street station and was built in 1955 to ensure crossing between Flinders Street and Melbourne's main train station was safer. It was completed ahead of the 1956 Melbourne Olympics.

Campbell Arcade also connects to two staircases leading to the northern and southern sides of Flinders Street. The arcade's salmon pink tiles, black marble pillars and art deco shopfronts are its original decor. Tramlines also run directly above the arcade.

Campbell Arcade is listed under the City of Melbourne and on the Victorian Heritage Register, under the listing for Flinders Street station (H1083). The Arcade itself was specifically added to the listing in 2015, "recognising its architectural qualities and historical significance", as the "first infrastructure to be built in the city following World War II" and as the centre of the city's suburban commuter railway system.

Since construction it has always been a shopping arcade. Before the City Loop distributed passengers to Melbourne's other train stations the arcade was far busier, though around 70,000 commuters still pass through of a morning. The pedestrian thoroughfare includes a bar, a coffee shop, hairdressers and a record store. Between 1994 and 2015 artworks were also displayed by the resident Platform Artists Group. This has since been taken over by The Dirty Dozen, an initiative of City of Melbourne's Creative Spaces. The arcade was also the former home of beloved Indie jewellery shop Corky Saint Clair, which has since moved to Swanston Street, Melbourne.

See also
 Lanes and arcades of Melbourne 
 Melbourne City Centre

References

Streets in Melbourne City Centre
Buildings and structures in Melbourne City Centre
Shopping arcades in Australia
Shopping centres in Melbourne
Shopping malls established in 1955